Chukwunweike Idigbe (9123-1983) was a justice of the Supreme Court of Nigeria, he was appointed to the position on April 10, 1964. He later served as Chief Justice of the Mid-Western region.

Life
Idigbe was born to family of Ignatious and Christiana Idigbe in Kaduna, both parents were from Asaba Delta State and in 1977, Justice Idigbe was bestowed the traditional chieftaincy title of Izoma of Asaba. His father was a produce officer with a marketing board and later appointed as a member of the Western House of Chiefs representing Asaba under the Action Group.

Idigbe started education at Stella Maris College, Port Harcourt. In 1937, he attended Christ the King College, Onitsha and then proceeded to study law at King's College London and Middle Temple (Inns Court of London) where he finished with a LL.B. Second Class Upper Division. He was called to the bar in 1947 and thereafter established a private law practice in Warri that covered the Western African Court of Appeal. On May 22, 1961, he was appointed a judge of the Western Nigeria High court. He was made a supreme Court Justice in 1964 and from 1966 to 1967, he served concurrently as the Chief Justice of the newly created Mid-Western region. However, in 1967, by virtue of his hometown, Idigbe was on the Biafran in the Nigerian Civil War and ceased to be a Nigerian judge. In 1972, he joined Irving and Bonnar, a private firm and three years later, he was re-appointed a judge in the Supreme Court. As a judge he was chairman of a land use committee set up to review the land tenure system in Nigeria.

References

Nigerian jurists
1923 births
1983 deaths
Alumni of King's College London
Supreme Court of Nigeria justices